The TBF International Under-16 Tournament, or TBF Under-16 Basketball World Cup, is an international boys' youth age basketball tournament that is contested between the best Under-16 age national teams in the world. The tournament takes place every year in Turkey, and is organized by the Turkish Basketball Federation (TBF). Since FIBA does not currently organize an under-16 age boys' world championship, this tournament serves as the de facto boys' official Under-16 World Cup. It is considered by followers of European basketball to be one of the most prestigious international tournaments in the boys' youth categories.

History
The first TBF International Under-16 Tournament took place in Sakarya, Turkey, in 1994. In the first tournament, which was won by Italy, it was an Under-18 competition. Since then, the tournament has been an Under-16 competition. The list of some of the players that have played at the tournament, and have then gone on to have successful pro careers, includes players like: Hedo Türkoğlu, Kerem Tunçeri, Dirk Nowitzki, Tony Parker, Ömer Aşık, Ersan İlyasova, and Peja Stojaković.

TBF International Under-16 Tournament results

See also
FIBA Under-17 World Cup
AST Under-18 World Cup
FIBA Under-19 World Cup

References

External links
Official Webpage (in Turkish)

Basketball competitions in Europe between national teams
International youth basketball competitions hosted by Turkey
Recurring sporting events established in 1994
1994 establishments in Turkey
Under-16 basketball competitions between national teams